Bratislava shooting may refer to:

2010 Bratislava shooting
2022 Bratislava shooting